Chantelle Allison (August 5, 1988) is an Australian professional wrestler better known by the ring name Shazza McKenzie. She is known for her work across the independent circuit for promotions such as Shine wrestling and SHIMMER Women Athletes.

Professional wrestling career

Independent circuit (2008-present) 
On September 20, 2008, McKenzie made her wrestling debut at Insane Championship Wrestling at their 'ICW End Game' event. McKenzie faced Alison Wonderland for the ICW women's championship which McKenzie lost. On September 26 McKenzie picked up her first win at Australasian Wrestling Federation where she faced Aurora and beat her. On November 8 McKenzie challenged Wonderland for the championship again at 'ICW Day Of Darkness 2008', this time beating her making her the new ICW women's champion. On March 3, 2012 McKenzie made her US (and international) independent circuit debut at East Coast Wrestling Association where she faced Kylie Pierce and defeated her. On June 14, 2014 at 'PWA home run', McKenzie faced Evie for the PWWA championship which McKenzie won. After 441 days of defending the PWWA championship, On August 29, 2015 at 'PWA Pin City', McKenzie lost the championship to Charli Evans and Jessica Troy. On April 9, 2017, at a PWA event, McKenzie teamed up with Big Fudge and called themselves 'The Choc Blockers' and they challenged the team of InstaGraham and Unsocial Jordan for the PWA tag team championship, which The Choc Blockers won. On June 3 McKenzie won the PWWA championship again after a three way match between Charli Evans and Harley Wonderland. On February 25, 2018, the team of 'The Choc Blockers' lost the PWA tag team championship to SnapChad and Unsocial Jordan at a PWA event. On 14 June 2019, McKenzie lost the PWWA championship to Jessica Troy at 'PWA Black Label', making her second PWWA championship reign 741 days long.

SHIMMER Women's Athletes (2012-present) 
On 17 March 2012, McKenzie made her Shimmer debut competing in Volume 45, teaming up with Veda Scott in a tag team match facing Melanie Cruise and Mena Libra which McKenzie and Scott lost. On April 13, 2013, McKenzie teamed up with Veda Scott again in Volume 55, this time facing the Canadian Ninjas (Nicole Matthews and Portia Perez) for the Shimmer tag team championship, which McKenzie and Scott won by disqualification which meant to title didn't change. On July 8, 2017, in Volume 93, McKenzie challenged Nicole Savoy for the Heart of Shimmer Championship which McKenzie won. On April 15, 2018, in Volume 104, McKenzie lost the Heart of Shimmer championship to Dust. On March 31, 2019 McKenzie challenged Savoy for the Shimmer championship which Mckenzie lost

Shine wrestling (2012-2016) 
On October 19, 2012, McKenzie made her debut at shine wrestling on the Shine 4 event. She teamed up with Davina Rose and faced Allysin Kay and Taylor Made in a tag match which they lost. On April 19, 2013, McKenzie returned to Shine on the Shine 9 event teaming with fellow Australians Jessie Mckay and Kellie Skater facing Mia Yim, Nikki Roxx and Santana which McKenzie's team won. On June 17, 2016 at Shine 35 McKenzie teamed up with Evie and faced Jayme Jameson and Marti Belle for the Shine tag team championship which McKenzie's team lost.

WWE

NXT (2015, 2018) 
On October 28, 2015, going by the ring name Shazza, made her WWE debut on NXT facing Emma whom Shazza lost to by submission. Shazza made her NXT return in May 2, 2018, where she faced Kairi Sane and lost by pinfall.

All Elite Wrestling (2019) 
On August 29, 2019 it was announced that McKenzie would be taking part in the AEW Casino battle royale at All Out which she was eliminated from. On November 8 McKenzie took part in a tag match on AEW Dark teaming with Shalandra Royal facing Nyla Rose and Leva Bates which McKenzie's team lost.

Personal life 
Allison started watching wrestling when she was 16. She was drawn in by Trish Stratus' mix of toughness and sexiness. From the first time she watched it, she knew wrestling was what she wanted to do. As soon as she had enough money, she joined the local wrestling school.

On October 12, 2018 Allison married fellow professional wrestler Unsocial Jordan.

Championships and accomplishments 
 All-Star Wrestling Australia
 ASWA Women's Championship (1 time)
 Insane Championship Wrestling
 ICW Women's Championship (1 time)
 PWA Black Label
 PWWA Championship (2 times)
 PWA Tag Team Championship (1 time) - with Big Fudge
 Renegades Of Wrestling
 ROW Women's Championship (1 time)
 Shimmer Women Athletes 
 Heart of Shimmer Championship (1 time)
'''World Series Wrestling
WSW Women's Championship (1 time, current)

References

External links

1988 births
Living people
Sportspeople from Sydney
Sportswomen from New South Wales
Australian female professional wrestlers
21st-century professional wrestlers